HDMS Lougen was a Danish naval brig launched in 1805. She saw service in the Danish navy and participated in two notable actions against the British Royal Navy during the Gunboat War. In 1814, as a result of the Treaty of Kiel, the Danes transferred her to the Norwegian navy. The Norwegians sold her to German merchants in the Scheld in 1825. She was finally shipwrecked near Bremerhaven in 1881.

Danish Navy

Lougen vs. Childers
On 14 March 1808 Lougen found the British brig  engaged in escort duty in Norwegian waters. Lougen  tried over the course of several hours to bring about an engagement, and eventually succeeded, but Childers escaped much damaged though her crew did suffer casualties.

Lougen vs. Seagull

On Sunday, 19 June 1808, off the Naze of Norway in the vicinity of the port of Kristiansand,  encountered and chased Lougen. Lougen, under the command of First Lieutenant Peter Frederik Wulff, tried to maintain a distance from Seagull to take advantage of the range of her 18-pounders relative to the range of Seagulls 24-pounder carronades. The chase brought both vessels close in shore where the fresh breeze was lessening to a near calm. Seagull tried to get between Lougen and the shore to prevent her from reaching Kristiansand.

Unfortunately for Seagull, about 20 minutes into the engagement six Danish gunboats arrived from behind some rocks, and in two divisions of three each, took up positions on Seagulls quarter, where they fired on her with their 24-pounder guns while Lougen fired on her larboard bow. Within half an hour the Danish fire had badly damaged Seagulls rigging and dismounted five of her guns. Eventually Seagulls captain, Commander Robert B. Cathcart, who was himself severely wounded, struck, having lost eight men killed and 20 wounded. Lougen had only one man killed and a dozen men slightly wounded.

Shortly after Seagull had surrendered, and after her crew and wounded had been taken off, she sank.  A number of the prize crew from the Lougen drowned as Seagull sank. The Danes later recovered Seagull and took her into their naval service.

In Northern Waters
Jochum Nicolay Müller, a native of Trondheim, took command of Lougen in 1809.

Three gun-schooners - Nornen, Valkyren, and Axel Thorsen - each with two 24-pounder guns, one fore and one aft – had joined them en route. This squadron sailed to find the British squadron in the waters of North Cape, for which, however, there were few and poor charts, and no pilotage instructions. The two remaining British ships, Nightingale and Gallant, had been warned of the Danes' approach and had left, apparently having sailed to Greenland to escort a convoy of British whalers. In the absence of the enemy, coastal trade blossomed with Russia and the Danish vessels escorted a final convoy of the year into Trondheim, including 11 prize merchant ships.

On 31 July 1811, Lougen, in company with the brigs  and Kiel, encountered  and  cruising together in Long Sound, Norway. The Danes had 54 guns and 480 men, against the British 22 guns and 107 men. Outnumbered and outgunned, the British vessels took flight.

The next day Brev Drageren unsuccessfully re-engaged first one and then two of the brigs. In the inconclusive engagement each British vessel sustained one man killed, and Brev Drageren also had three wounded. In the second day's fight, Algerine sent a boat and sweeps to Brev Drageren, which helped her escape the Danes, though not until after her crew had rowed for 30 hours. Lolland captured two mercantile galleases that Brev Drageren had been escorting.

Fate
After the Treaty of Kiel and Norway's separation from Denmark, Lougen was transferred to the Norwegian navy in 1814. In 1825 the Norwegians sold her into the merchant navy and she moved to the Scheldt. She was shipwrecked in 1881 at Bremerhaven.

Notes, citations, and references
Notes

Citations

References

Danish Military History website (if necessary, type Lougen in the search box, then click read more.)
Danish 
 The Danish Naval Museum is building a new website at which many details, drawings and models may be available. The English language version of this website is still under construction (March 2016)
T. A. Topsøe-Jensen og Emil Marquard (1935) "Officerer i den dansk-norske Søetat 1660-1814 og den danske Søetat 1814-1932".

Images and Models

Brigs of the Royal Dano-Norwegian Navy
Ships built in Copenhagen
1805 ships
Brigs
1814 in Norway
Ships of the Royal Norwegian Navy
Ships designed by Ernst Wilhelm Stibolt